The pound or lira ( Lira Yisra'elit,  Junayh ʾIsrāʾīlī; abbreviation: IL in Latin, ל"י in Hebrew; code ) was the currency of the State of Israel from 9 June 1952 until 23 February 1980. The Israeli pound replaced the Palestine pound and was initially pegged at par to £1 sterling. It was replaced by the shekel on 24 February 1980, at the rate of IS 1 = IL 10, which was in turn replaced by the new shekel in 1985.

Before the new currency was brought in, the Anglo-Palestine Bank issued banknotes denominated in Palestine pounds. They were in Hebrew  (lira E.Y. i.e. lira Eretz-Yisraelit) and Arabic junayh filisṭīnī.

On 1 May 1951, all the assets and liabilities of the Anglo Palestine Bank were transferred to a new company called Bank Leumi Le-Yisrael (Israel National Bank) and the currency name became: lira yisraelit in Hebrew, junayh ʾisrāʾīlī in Arabic, and Israeli pound in English. The new currency was issued in 1952, and entered circulation on June 9. From 1955, after the Bank of Israel was established and took over the duty of issuing banknotes, only the Hebrew name was used.

History

The British Mandate of Palestine was created in 1918. In 1927 the Palestine Currency Board, established by the British authorities, and subject to the British Secretary of State for the Colonies, issued the Palestine pound (£P) which was legal tender in Mandate Palestine and Transjordan. £P1 was fixed at exactly £1 sterling. It was divided into 1,000 mils.

The Mandate came to an end on 14 May 1948, but the Palestine pound continued in circulation until new currencies replaced it. In Israel, the Palestine pound continued in circulation until the Israeli pound was adopted in 1952. The Israeli pound was subdivided into 1,000 prutot. The Israeli pound retained the Palestine pound's sterling peg. In August 1948, new banknotes were issued by the London-based Anglo-Palestine Bank, owned by the Jewish Agency.

The new coins were the first to bear the new state's name, and the banknotes had "The Anglo-Palestine Bank Limited" written on them. While the first coins minted by Israel were still denominated in "mils", the next ones bore the Hebrew name prutah. A second series of banknotes was issued after the Anglo-Palestine Bank moved its headquarters to Tel Aviv and became the Bank Leumi ( "National Bank"). The peg to sterling was abolished on 1 January 1954, and in 1960, the subdivision of the pound was changed from 1,000 prutot to 100 agorot (singular agora).

Because lira was a loanword from Latin, a debate emerged in the 1960s over the name of the Israeli currency due to its non-Hebrew origins. This resulted in a law ordering the Minister of Finance to change the name from lira to the Hebrew name shekel. The law allowed the minister to decide on the date for the change. The law came into effect in February 1980, when the Israeli government introduced the 'Israeli shekel' (now called old Israeli shekel), at a rate of IL 10 = IS 1. On 1 January 1986, the old shekel was replaced by the Israeli new shekel at a ratio of IS1,000:₪1.

Coins
Israel's first coins were aluminium 25 mil pieces, dated 1948 and 1949, which were issued in 1949 before the adoption of the pruta. Later in 1949, coins were issued in denominations of 1, 5, 10, 25, 50, 100 and 250 prutah. The coins were conceived, in part, by Israeli graphic designer Otte Wallish.

All coins and banknotes issued in Israel before June 1952 were part of the Palestine pound.

In 1960, coins were issued denominated in agora. There were 1, 5, 10 and 25 agorot pieces. In 1963, IL  and IL 1 coins were introduced, followed by IL 5 coins in 1978.

Mil (1949)

Pruta (1949–1960)

Agora (1960–1978)

Banknotes

In 1948, the government issued fractional notes for 50 and 100 mils. The Anglo-Palestine Bank issued banknotes for 500 mils, 1, 5, 10 and 50 pounds between 1948 and 1951. In 1952, the government issued a second series of fractional notes for 50 and 100 prutah with 250 prutah notes added in 1953. Also in 1952, the "Bank Leumi Le-Israel" took over paper money production and issued the same denominations as the Anglo-Palestine Bank except that the 500 mils was replaced by a 500 prutah note.

The Bank of Israel began note production in 1955, also issuing notes for 500 prutah, IL 1, IL 5, IL 10 and IL 50. In 1968, IL 100 notes were introduced, followed by IL 500 notes in 1975.

Bank Leumi series (1952)

First series (1955)

Second series (1959)

Third series (1970)

Fourth series (1975)

See also
 Bank of Israel
 Economy of Israel
 Paul Kor

Citations

General and cited references

External links

 Past Notes & Coins Series. Bank of Israel

1948 establishments in Israel
1980 disestablishments in Israel
Cultural depictions of David Ben-Gurion
Cultural depictions of Albert Einstein
Pound
Modern obsolete currencies